Sup or SUP may refer to:

 Saskatchewan United Party, a political party in Saskatchewan
 Supremum or sup, in mathematics, the least upper bound
 Societas unius personae, proposed EU type of single-person company
 SUP Media or Sup Fabrik, a Russian internet company
 Sailors' Union of the Pacific
 Scottish Unionist Party (1986), established in the mid 1980s
 Simple Update Protocol, dropped proposal to speed RSS and Atom
 Software Upgrade Protocol
 Standup paddleboarding
 Stanford University Press
 Sydney University Press
 Syracuse University Press
 Sup squark, the supersymmetric partner  of the up quark
 <sup>, an HTML tag for superscript
 Supangle or sup, a Turkish dessert

See also
 Socialist Unity Party (disambiguation)
 Syriac Union Party (disambiguation)
 Supper, a meal that is consumed before bed
 Super (disambiguation)